The following is a list of ancient physicians who were known to have practised, contributed, or theorised about medicine in some form between the 30th century BCE and 4th century CE.

30th century to 1st century BCE

1st century to 4th century CE

References 

ancient
doctors